The 2011–12 season was Lille OSC's sixty-eighth season in existence and the club's twelfth consecutive season in the top flight of French football.

Players

Squad

Source:

Appearances and goals

Transfers

In

Out

1 – Adil Rami was sold to Valencia on 3 January 2011 for an undisclosed fee. He remained on loan at Lille until the end of the 2010–11 season and returned to Valencia permanently on 13 June 2011

Loan in

Loan out

Preseason

Competitions

Overview

Trophée des Champions

Ligue 1

League table

Results summary

Results by round

Matches

Coupe de France

Coupe de la Ligue

UEFA Champions League

Group stage

References 

Lille OSC seasons
Lille OSC
Lille OSC